Kivuti Maxwell is a Kenyan politician. He belongs to Safina and was elected to represent the Siakago Constituency in the National Assembly of Kenya since the 2007 Kenyan parliamentary election.

References

Living people
Year of birth missing (living people)
Safina politicians
Members of the National Assembly (Kenya)
Place of birth missing (living people)